Switzerland is set to participate in the Eurovision Song Contest 2023 in Liverpool, United Kingdom, having internally selected Remo Forrer to represent the country with the song "Watergun".

Background 

Prior to the 2023 contest, Switzerland had participated in the Eurovision Song Contest sixty-two times since its first entry in 1956. Their second and, to this point, most recent victory was achieved in  when Canadian singer Céline Dion won the contest with the song "". In 2005, the internal selection of Estonian girl band Vanilla Ninja, performing the song "Cool Vibes", qualified Switzerland to the final where they placed 8th. Due to their successful result in 2005, Switzerland was pre-qualified to compete directly in the final in 2006. Between 2007 and 2010, the nation failed to qualify to the final after a string of internal selections. Opting to organize a national final between 2011 and 2018, Switzerland has managed to qualify to the final twice out of the last eight years. After returning to an internal selection in 2019, Switzerland has managed to qualify to the final in all contests they participated in and yielded two top five results. In , "Boys Do Cry" performed by Marius Bear qualified for the final and finished 17th.

The Swiss national broadcaster, Swiss Broadcasting Corporation (SRG SSR), broadcasts the event within Switzerland and organises the selection process for the nation's entry. SRG SSR confirmed their intentions to participate at the 2022 Eurovision Song Contest on 12 July 2022. Along with their participation confirmation, the broadcaster announced that the Swiss entry for the 2023 contest would be selected internally. Switzerland has selected their entry for the Eurovision Song Contest through both national finals and internal selections in the past. Between 2011 and 2018, the broadcaster has opted to organize a national final in order to select their entry. Since 2019, the Swiss entry was internally selected for the competition.

Before Eurovision

Internal selection 
SRG SSR opened a submission period between 25 August 2022 and 8 September 2022 for interested artists and composers to submit their entries. Artists and songwriters of any nationality were able to submit songs; however those with a Swiss passport or residency were given priority. Songs shortlisted from the received submissions were then tested by their music producers with various artists and the combination of a 100-member public panel (50%) and the votes of a 23-member international expert jury (50%) selected the Swiss entry. The members of the public panel were Swiss residents put together according to selected criteria in cooperation with Digame, while the international jury consisted of members who had been national juries for their respective countries at the Eurovision Song Contest.

Remo Forrer was announced as the Swiss entrant for the contest on 20 February 2023. Forrer had previously participated in and won both the third season of the Swiss reality singing competition The Voice of Switzerland and one episode of German music game I Can See Your Voice. Forrer's song for the contest, "Watergun", was revealed on 7 March 2023.

At Eurovision 
According to Eurovision rules, all nations with the exceptions of the host country and the "Big Five" (France, Germany, Italy, Spain and the United Kingdom) are required to qualify from one of two semi-finals in order to compete for the final; the top ten countries from each semi-final progress to the final. The European Broadcasting Union (EBU) split up the competing countries into five different pots based on voting patterns from previous contests, with countries with favourable voting histories put into the same pot. On 31 January 2023, an allocation draw was held which placed each country into one of the two semi-finals, and determined which half of the show they would perform in. Switzerland was placed into the first semi-final, which will be held on 9 May 2023, and has been scheduled to perform in the second half of the show.

References 

2023
Countries in the Eurovision Song Contest 2023
Eurovision